Elmar Theodor Mäder (born 28 July 1963) was the thirty-third Commandant of the Pontifical Swiss Guards. He held the rank of colonel in the Guards.

Biography
 
Mäder was born in Niederuzwil and grew up in Zuzwil in the canton of St. Gallen, one of five children of Theo and Katharina Mäder. He studied at the Hochschule in St. Gallen and at the University of Freiburg before entering the Swiss Army where he attained the rank of First Lieutenant in the Air Defense Troops. He entered the Papal Swiss Guards in 1998 and was named commandant in 2002, succeeding Pius Segmüller.

Mäder made headlines when he said that there was no plan to allow women into the Swiss Guards. His reason was that the Guard's quarters were too small and the entry of women would lead to discipline problems.

He was walking along the Popemobile on 6 June 2007 when a German man jumped over the security cordons and tried to jump into the vehicle.

Mäder is married to Theresia Blöchliger and they have four children.

Distinctions

National orders
 : Commander of the Order of Merit of the Italian Republic

Foreign orders
 : Commander of the Order of Saint Gregory the Great
 : Commander of the Order of Saint Sylvester
 : Knight of the Order of the Holy Sepulchre
 : Order Pro Merito Melitensi, Grand Officer's Cross with Swords
  Knight Grand Cross of Merit of the Sacred Military Constantinian Order of Saint George

References

Commanders of the Swiss Guard
1963 births
Living people
Knights of the Order of St. Sylvester
Knights of the Holy Sepulchre
Recipients of the Order pro Merito Melitensi
Swiss military officers